Bells Creek is a rural locality in the Sunshine Coast Region, Queensland, Australia.

Geography 
The Bruce Highway traverses the locality from the south-west to the north-west. Most of the land is freehold and used for farming. The Mooloolah River National Park is in the north-western corner of the locality. The south-western corner of the locality forms part of the Beerwah State Forest.

History 
The locality takes its name from the creek, which in turn was named after Mary Alice Bell (later Eglington) who bought Portion 29 south of the creek. She was the governess of the children of explorer and pioneer William Landsborough. The creek had previously been known as Kelaher Creek and by the Indigenous people as Tooringoor.

The population was 52.1% female and 47.9% male. The median age of the Bells Creek population was 32 years, 5 years below the national median of 37. 79.6% of people living in Bells Creek were born in Australia. The other top responses for country of birth were New Zealand 3.8%, England 3.5%, Scotland 1.9%, Samoa 1.9%, United States of America 1.6%. 89.8% of people spoke only English at home; the next most common languages were 1.9% Arabic, 1.3% Afrikaans.

On 18 August 2017 the north-eastern part of Bells Creek was excised to create the locality of Baringa to accommodate future suburban growth in the Caloundra South Priority Development Area.

On 14 June 2019 the localities of Bells Creek and Meridan Plains were again excised to the localities of Banya, Corbould Park, Gagalba and Nirimba to accommodate future suburban growth in the Caloundra South Priority Development Area.

References

Suburbs of the Sunshine Coast Region
Localities in Queensland